The Ierța is a right tributary of the river Iara in Romania. It flows into the Iara in Băișoara.

References

Rivers of Romania
Rivers of Cluj County